Marthe Valle (born 29 November 1982 in Harstad, Norway), is a singer and songwriter, living in Bergen.

Career 
Valle released her first solo album, It's A Bag of Candy (2005), awarded the Spellemannprisen as best newcomer. In addition, she was also nominated for Best Female Artist that year. In 2010 she went all the way to the final of the Norwegian X Factor, but was turned down in the sixth final round, as number seven. She participated in the Melodi Grand Prix 2012.

Valle was a partner of the basketball player Marco Elsafadi, and together they have a daughter.

Honors 
2005: Spellemannprisen as This years newcomer, for It's A Bag of Candy

Discography 
2005: It's A Bag of Candy (Grammar Records)
2008: Forever Candid (Alfred Records)

References

External links 

Norwegian women singers
Norwegian songwriters
Melodi Grand Prix contestants
Spellemannprisen winners
Musicians from Harstad
1982 births
Living people